is a Japanese composer, arranger, and orchestrator based in Los Angeles. His most notable works are the musical scores for Tokyo Ghoul and Vinland Saga.

Biography 
Yutaka is an alumnus of the Senzoku Gakuen College of Music in Japan, where he studied musical composition under Toshiyuki Watanabe and Masataka Matsuo. 
Yutaka has written scores for more than 40 projects, including the anime series Tokyo Ghoul, the Japanese TV series Marumo no Okite (Marumo's Rule) and a number of TV commercials such as "Audi", "Samsung Galaxy" and "Georgia (Coca-Cola)".

Yutaka's work on Tokyo Ghoul attracted public attention shortly after its release in 2014. Its original soundtrack, which includes the main theme song "Glassy Sky" (sung by Donna Burke), gained popularity and has over 50,000,000 views on YouTube. In 2018, Eminem sampled "Glassy Sky" on the track "Good Guy" from his Kamikaze album.

Yutaka has continued to produce popular music in collaboration with vocalists, including the tracks "Never Let Me Go" (sung by Julia Shortreed) and "Take My Hand" (sung by NIKIIE), both of which were ranked No. 1 on iTunes chart in Japan. In 2017, Yutaka relocated to Los Angeles and began working with Soundtrack Music Associates for representation.

Works

Anime

Television dramas

Movies

Awards and recognition 
 2009 Grand prize at VIENNA INSTRUMENTS Strings Arrangement Contest.
 2016 Brilliant Citizen Award ("Azalea Kagayaki") by the city of Kawasaki, Japan.

References

External links 
 
  
 Soundtrack Music Associates
 Current,Inc. (in Japanese)

1989 births
Living people
21st-century Japanese composers
21st-century Japanese male musicians
Anime composers
Japanese film score composers
Japanese male film score composers
Japanese music arrangers
Musicians from Tokyo